Rugby sevens, for the 2013 Pacific Mini Games, was held at Kafika Stadium in Mata-Utu, Wallis and Futuna. The men's tournament was contested by seven Pacific countries. There was no women's tournament for this sport at these games. The competitions took place on the 10 and 11 September 2013.

Results

Round robin
{| class="wikitable" style="text-align: center;"
|-
!width="200"|Teams
!width="40"|Pld
!width="40"|W
!width="40"|D
!width="40"|L
!width="40"|PF
!width="40"|PA
!width="40"|+/−
!width="40"|Pts
|-
|align=left|
|6||6||0||0||236||22||+214||18
|-
|align=left|
|6||5||0||1||189||24||+165||16
|-
|align=left|
|6||4||0||2||126||68||+58||14
|-
|align=left|
|6||3||0||3||137||102||+35||12
|-
|align=left| 
|6||2||0||4||81||181||−100||10
|-
|align=left|
|6||1||0||5||33||230||−197||8
|-
|align=left|
|6||0||0||6||24||199||−175||6
|}

Knockout stage

5th Place

Medal Rounds

Final rankings

References

2013
2013 rugby sevens competitions
2013 Pacific Mini Games